The 1954 Harwich by-election was a parliamentary by-election held on 11 February 1954 for the House of Commons constituency of Harwich.

Background

Constituency
The seat consisted of the port town of Harwich, the seaside towns of Clacton-on-Sea, Brightlingsea, Frinton-on-Sea and Walton-on-the-Naze, and most of the primarily rural Tendring District.

Trigger
The seat had become vacant when the National Liberal Member of Parliament (MP) Stanley Holmes was elevated to the peerage as Baron Dovercourt, having held the seat since the 1935 general election.

Candidates

National Liberal
National Liberal party chose Julian Ridsdale, the nephew both of former Conservative Prime Minister Stanley Baldwin and Liberal MP Sir Aurelian Ridsdale as its candidate. He had contested Paddington North at the 1951 general election as the Conservative Party candidate.

Labour
In the autumn of 1952 the Harwich Labour party selected the 22 year old former chair of Oxford University Labour Club Shirley Catlin as its prospective candidate, after the only other candidate made it clear that he had no interest in running.

Result
The Conservative and Liberal candidate, Julian Ridsdale held the seat for the government. He remained the constituency's MP until his retirement 38 years later at the 1992 general election. Shirley Catlin would later, under her married name Shirley Williams; be elected as MP for Hitchin and would serve in the Cabinets of Harold Wilson and James Callaghan.

References

Harwich by-election
Harwich by-election
Harwich
By-elections to the Parliament of the United Kingdom in Essex constituencies
1950s in Essex